Elaine Debra Kaplan (born December 18, 1955) is the chief judge of the United States Court of Federal Claims. She served as General Counsel of the United States Office of Personnel Management from 2009 to 2013, and as acting director of the office in 2013.

Early life and career
Kaplan was born in 1955 in Brooklyn, New York. She received a Bachelor of Arts degree in 1976 from Binghamton University. She received a Juris Doctor, cum laude, in 1979, from the Georgetown University Law Center.

She began her career as a staff attorney in the Solicitor's Office of the United States Department of Labor. From 1984–98, she worked for the National Treasury Employees Union (NTEU), with increasing levels of responsibility. In 1998, she was unanimously confirmed by the Senate to serve as the head of the United States Office of Special Counsel and served five years in that position.

From 2003–04, she served as of counsel at the law firm of Bernabei and Katz. From 2004–09, she served as Senior Deputy General Counsel at the NTEU. From 2009–13, she was the General Counsel of the United States Office of Personnel Management. Kaplan took the office of Acting Director in April 2013, after Director John Berry's four-year term expired.

Claims Court service
On March 19, 2013, President Barack Obama nominated Kaplan to serve as a Judge of the United States Court of Federal Claims, to the seat vacated by Judge Christine Odell Cook Miller.

The Senate Judiciary Committee held a hearing on her nomination on May 8, 2013, and reported her nomination to the floor by voice vote on June 6, 2013. Her nomination was confirmed on September 17, 2013 by a 64–35 vote. She took the oath of office from Chief Judge Patricia E. Campbell-Smith on November 6, 2013. On March 2, 2021, President Joe Biden designated Kaplan as Chief Judge.

Personal
Kaplan is open about her lesbian identity.

See also 
 List of LGBT jurists in the United States

References

External links

United States Court of Federal Claims page on Elaine D. Kaplan

|-

1955 births
Living people
Binghamton University alumni
Directors of the United States Office of Personnel Management
Georgetown University Law Center alumni
Judges of the United States Court of Federal Claims
Lesbians
LGBT appointed officials in the United States
LGBT judges
LGBT lawyers
LGBT people from New York (state)
New York (state) Democrats
People from Brooklyn
United States Article I federal judges appointed by Barack Obama
United States Department of the Treasury officials
21st-century American judges